In mathematics, the  Bohr compactification of a topological group G is a compact Hausdorff topological group H that may be canonically associated to G. Its importance lies in the reduction of the theory of uniformly almost periodic functions on G to the theory of continuous functions on H. The concept is named after Harald Bohr who pioneered the study of almost periodic functions, on the real line.

Definitions and basic properties
Given a topological group G, the Bohr compactification of G  is a compact Hausdorff topological group Bohr(G) and a continuous homomorphism

b: G → Bohr(G)

which is universal with respect to homomorphisms into compact Hausdorff groups;  this means that if K is another compact Hausdorff topological group and

f: G → K

is a continuous homomorphism, then there is a unique continuous homomorphism

Bohr(f): Bohr(G) → K

such that f = Bohr(f) ∘ b.

Theorem.  The Bohr compactification exists and is unique up to isomorphism.

We will denote the Bohr compactification of G by Bohr(G) and the canonical map by

The correspondence G ↦ Bohr(G) defines a covariant functor on the category of topological groups and continuous homomorphisms.

The Bohr compactification is intimately connected to the finite-dimensional unitary representation theory of a topological group.  The kernel of b consists exactly of those elements of G which cannot be separated from the identity of G by finite-dimensional unitary representations.

The Bohr compactification also reduces many problems in the theory of almost periodic functions on topological groups to that of functions on compact groups.

A bounded continuous  complex-valued function f on a topological group G is uniformly almost periodic if and only if the set of right translates gf where

is relatively compact in the uniform topology as g varies through G.

Theorem. A bounded continuous  complex-valued function f on G is uniformly almost periodic if and only if there is a continuous function f1 on Bohr(G) (which is uniquely determined) such that

Maximally almost periodic groups
Topological groups for which the Bohr compactification mapping is injective are called maximally almost periodic (or MAP groups).  In the case G is a locally compact connected group, MAP groups are completely characterized: They are precisely products of compact groups with vector groups
of finite dimension.

See also

References 

Topological groups
Harmonic analysis
Compactification (mathematics)